Assembly is the fifth studio album by the Norwegian metal band Theatre of Tragedy, released in 2002. It continued the group's move from gothic to a more electronic and pop style of music. This style was described as similar to "Siouxsie and the Banshees jamming with Ace of Base".

Assembly was the last Theatre of Tragedy album featuring the vocals of Liv Kristine. According to Kristine the band fired her by email, citing musical differences.

While Musique themes mentioned radios, streetfighting and nightlife, the songs on Assembly generally focus more on people than technology, such as in "Play" and "Let You Down". The album's modern setting is still emphasised by "Automatic Lover", which refers to modern nightlife, and "Universal Race", which uses space travel as a metaphor for sexual intercourse.

A limited edition of the album contains the cover of "You Keep Me Hangin' On" as bonus track. The song was originally a hit by The Supremes and was also made famous by Vanilla Fudge and Kim Wilde.

The cover art was designed by Thomas Ewerhard, who also made the covers for the next two albums by the band, Storm and Forever Is the World.

Metal Mind Productions reissued the album on 27 July 2009. The album has been digitally remastered using 24-bit process on a golden disc and includes three bonus tracks, "You Keep Me Hangin' On", "Let You Down" (Remix) and "Motion" (Funker Vogt Remix). The album is limited to 2,000 copies.

Track listing 
All songs written and composed by Theatre of Tragedy, except for "You Keep Me Hanging On" by Holland–Dozier–Holland.

Personnel

Theatre of Tragedy
Raymond I. Rohonyi - vocals, programming
Liv Kristine Espenæs - vocals
Frank Claussen - guitars
Vegard K. Thorsen - guitars
Lorentz Aspen - keyboards
Hein Frode Hansen - drums

Production
Hiili Hiilesmaa - producer, engineer, mixing at Finnvox Studios
Jukka Puurula - engineer
Mika Jussila - mastering

Singles 
Two singles were released from this record.
 "Envision" was released in 2002. As well as the title track the disc featured the Conetik Remix, the album version of "Superdrive", and The Supremes cover "You Keep Me Hangin' On".
 "Let You Down" was also released in 2002. This disc contains (as well as the title track) a Rico Darum & Superdead remix of "Let You Down".

Charts

References 

2002 albums
Theatre of Tragedy albums
Nuclear Blast albums
East West Records albums
Pony Canyon albums